The Sukhoi Su-57 is a multirole fighter aircraft.

SU-57, Su-57, or Su57 may also refer to:

 T48 Gun Motor Carriage, a U.S. WWII self-propelled anti-tank gun designated as SU-57 (Samokhodnaya ustanovka 57) under Soviet service in lend-lease
 ItPsv SU-57, the Finnish designation for the Soviet ZSU-57-2 self-propelled anti-aircraft gun